Tusvik or Tusvika is a small village in Sykkylven Municipality in Møre og Romsdal county, Norway.

Tusvik lies in Sykkylven Municipality, which is primarily an industrial area, with large industries such as RAJO, Ekornes, and LK Hjelle Møbelfabrikk based here. The lake Tuvatnet is located just west of the village.

References

Villages in Møre og Romsdal
Sykkylven